Glebe Stone Circles are standing stones and National Monument located in County Mayo, Ireland.

Location

Glebe Standing Stones are located about 1.6 km (1 mile) east-northeast of Cong.

History

The circles were first noted by Edward Lhuyd on his tour of Ireland in 1699; William Stukeley later reproduced Lhuyd's unpublished drawings.

William Wilde connected them to the mythical Battle of Moytura:

Description

There are four circles in a variety of styles.

Glebe (North)
The monument was later landscaped as a tree ring, and some stones have been disturbed by tree roots.

Nymphsfield 1 (West)
About  in diameter, the smallest circle.

Tonaleeaun (East)
An embanked recumbent stone circle with an orthostat at the west end.

Nymphsfield 2 (South)
 in diameter with 19 stones.

References

National Monuments in County Mayo
Archaeological sites in County Mayo